Luther A. Wright Jr. (born September 22, 1971) is an American former professional basketball player, in the center position.

Basketball career
A native of Jersey City, New Jersey, Wright played high school ball for one season under coach Bob Hurley at powerhouse at St. Anthony High School before failing out and enrolling at Elizabeth High School in Elizabeth, New Jersey. He played two seasons of college basketball at Seton Hall University, averaging 9.0 points, 7.5 rebounds, and 2.2 blocked shots per game as a sophomore, before leaving school in 1993 to pursue professional basketball.

Professional
Wright was selected by the Utah Jazz in the 1st round (18th overall) of the 1993 NBA Draft.  Listed at 7'2" and 270 pounds in college, Wright arrived in Utah overweight and out-of-shape at 325 pounds.  The Jazz were not short on size at that time, with Mark Eaton (7'4" and 290 pounds), Isaac Austin (6'10" and 290 pounds), and Felton Spencer (7'0" and 275 pounds) on the roster at center.  Wright was seen as a project who the Jazz planned to develop slowly.  However, poor play on the court, in addition to poor conditioning and mental health issues, limited Wright to only one season in the NBA.  He averaged 1.3 points and 0.7 rebounds in 15 games.

Personal problems
In January 1994, police found Wright at a highway rest area west of Salt Lake City, banging garbage cans and smashing in car windows.

After the season with the Jazz finished, he entered a mental institution. Still during his NBA stint, he was diagnosed with bipolar disorder and left the team. In 1996, he was released from Essex County Hospital Center, a psychiatric hospital, after a 30-day admission. Under the terms of his contract with the Jazz, Wright was to be paid US$153,000 per year for 25 full years.

References

External links
Stats at Basketball-Reference

1971 births
Living people
21st-century African-American sportspeople
African-American basketball players
American men's basketball players
Basketball players from Jersey City, New Jersey
Centers (basketball)
Elizabeth High School (New Jersey) alumni
McDonald's High School All-Americans
Parade High School All-Americans (boys' basketball)
People with bipolar disorder
Seton Hall Pirates men's basketball players
Sportspeople from Elizabeth, New Jersey
Universiade gold medalists for the United States
Universiade medalists in basketball
Utah Jazz draft picks
Utah Jazz players
20th-century African-American sportspeople